Tang Long is a fictional character in Water Margin, one of the Four Great Classical Novels in Chinese literature. Nicknamed "Gold Coin Spotted Leopard", he ranks 88th among the 108 Stars of Destiny and 52nd among the 72 Earthly Fiends.

Background
Seven-chi-tall Tang Long is nicknamed "Gold Coin Spotted Leopard" as he is dappled with freckles from head to feet. After his father, an official at Yan'an Prefecture (延安府; present-day Yan'an, Shaanxi), died, he drifts from place to place working as a blacksmith. Tang, a hardcore gambler, knows some martial arts and fights mainly with spear or staff.

Joining Liangshan
Dai Zong and Li Kui are sent to fetch the magician Gongsun Sheng from his home in Jizhou (薊州; present-day Ji County, Tianjin) as Liangshan could not counter the sorcery of Gao Lian, the prefect of Gaotangzhou (高唐州; present-day Gaotang County), in their military attack on the city to rescue Chai Jin. Gongsun has been away for a long time to visit his mother.

As Dai Zong and Li Kui return to Gaotangzhou with Gongsun Sheng, they come to an inn to have their meal. As Gongsun is a vegetarian, Li Kui volunteers to go find something that suits him. Li comes upon Tang Long on a busy street, who has attracted a cheering crowd as he swings a huge mallet to smash a huge stone. Li Kui is impressed but he tells Tang he could easily do the same. Tang, who was initially doubtful, is surprised when Li wields the mallet with little effort. After mutually introducing themselves, Tang is asked to join Liangshan as Li sees great value in his metalworking skill. Tang gladly agrees.

Recruiting Xu Ning
To retaliate against Liangshan for killing his cousin Gao Lian, Grand Marshal Gao Qiu sends imperial general Huyan Zhuo on a military attack to wipe out the outlaws. Huyan has the upper hand when he deploys his cavalry consisting of groups of chain-linked armoured horses which charge as one at the Liangshan force. The outlaws have to hole up behind the marsh as they work out how to counter-attack. As no one has a solution, Tang Long steps forth to recommend his cousin Xu Ning, an imperial troops instructor at the imperial capital Dongjing, who he says could fell Huyan's cavalry with his skillful use of the hooked lance.

Song Jiang sanctions the plan devised by Tang Long to recruit Xu Ning. Shi Qian, who could scale walls and move on rooftops to get into premises, sneaks into Xu's house after nightfall to steal a precious family heirloom of his – an impenetrable lightweight golden armoured vest. Tang Long then pretends to call on Xu the next morning. Upset with the loss of the vest, Xu believes Tang's claim that he has just seen a man carrying a box like the one containing his prized heirloom. So Xu embarks on a long chase after Shi Qian, accompanied by Tang Long, which takes him to the vicinity of Liangshan. He is then drugged and taken to the stronghold. When he comes to, he has no choice but to join Liangshan.  

Tang Long, who is skilled in metalwork, oversees the making of hooked lances while Xu Ning trains a squad to use the weapon. The Liangshan outlaws then fells Huyan Zhuo's cavalry causing his army to collapse.

Campaigns and death
Tang Long is appointed as the chief armourer of Liangshan after the 108 Stars of Destiny came together in what is called the Grand Assembly. He participates in the campaigns against the Liao invaders and rebel forces in Song territory following amnesty from Emperor Huizong for Liangshan.

In the battle of Qingxi County (清溪縣; present-day Chun'an County, Zhejiang) in the campaign against Fang La, Tang Long is severely injured. He soon succumbs to his wounds.

References
 
 
 
 
 
 
 

72 Earthly Fiends
Blacksmiths
Fictional characters from Shaanxi